Francisco José de Paula Gelabert (1758 – after June 21, 1832) was an honorary commissioner of War who was Royal Governor of West Florida between May and September, 1796.

Paula Gelabert was born in Madrid, Spain, sometime in the 18th century. He was son of Antonio de Paula Gelabert and Rosa Estrani. His parents were natives from Barcelona and Vich (Catalonia, Spain) respectively. His father was descended from an ancient and noble lineage from Catalonia. Francisco José de Paula Gelabert was an honorary War Commissioner  who, in May 1796, was appointed Royal Governor of West Florida, office he occupied until September this year.

He was married Maria Coleta Hore Piña, with whom he had two children: Antonio (born June 17, 1814) and María Angela (born February 28, 1821), and one granddaughter: María Concepción (born in 1848). He, after being widowed, remarried on June 21, 1832, with María Ignacia Correa, native from Palencia (Spain).

Gelabert died after June 21, 1832.

References 

Governors of West Florida
People from Madrid
Royal Governors of La Florida
1758 births
19th-century deaths
Year of death missing